Niğde railway station is a railway station in Niğde, Turkey. TCDD Taşımacılık operates a daily intercity train, the Erciyes Express, from Kayseri to Adana.

Niğde station was built in 1933 by the Turkish State Railways, as part of a railway to link the Trans-Anatolian railway with the former Baghdad Railway as an eastern route from the Mediterranean coast to Turkey's central interior.

References

External links
TCDD Taşımacılık
Passenger trains
Station information
Station timetable

Railway stations in Niğde Province
Railway stations opened in 1933
1933 establishments in Turkey